Sarcococca zeylanica is a species of evergreen shrub or groundcover, endemic to Sri Lanka.

References

zeylanica
Flora of Sri Lanka
Taxa named by Henri Ernest Baillon